Destanie Yarbrough is an American professional martial artist, specializing in Muay Thai. She competes in the Heavyweight (MMA) division.

Background

Destanie Yarbrough was born on July 12, 1990. She won a college scholarship for track and field to California State University, Long Beach, later transferring to Fresno State for track and field.

Yarbrough was a star running back for the Central Cal War Angels of the Women's Football Alliance until the team was dissolved in November 2017.  She became a pro fighter in 2016.

Yarbrough trains in Fresno, California, at the Halo Jiu Jitsu Training Center.

Yarbrough has been an outspoken advocate for her WMMA division: “Personally, I feel MMA fans outside the United States are more accepting of female heavy- and open weight fighters. I hope and believe that the women’s heavy- and open weight divisions will grow via depth in fighters, fans, popularity, and significance. I feel at this moment we are seen as a “joke” in the sport; there are promoters, organizations, and people who see us as “fat chicks” – unpleasant and distasteful to their eyes. My response to those people is always, ‘To each his own!‘ We are a determined and powerful group of women, in and out of the cage. We will not stop paving this road until we can claim a championship belt.”

Mixed martial arts career

For her first heavyweight fight, Yarbrough faced Crystal Parson at The Warriors Cage 24 in Porterville California on April 1, 2016. She won by technical knockout (doctor stoppage) in the first round.

For her second heavyweight fight, Yarbrough faced Gabi Garcia at Rizin World Grand-Prix 2016: 1st Round on September 25, 2016.  She lost the fight via americana submission in the first round.

For her third fight, Yarbrough faced Begimzhan Kasymova at 2017 in Road FC on Dec 23, 2017. She won the fight via decision in the second round.

Mixed martial arts record

References

External links
http://www.sherdog.com/fighter/Destanie-Yarbrough-220815 Sherdog.com

1990 births
Living people
Heavyweight mixed martial artists
Mixed martial artists utilizing Muay Thai
Mixed martial artists utilizing boxing
Mixed martial artists utilizing shootboxing
Mixed martial artists utilizing wrestling
Mixed martial artists utilizing Brazilian jiu-jitsu
American female mixed martial artists
American practitioners of Brazilian jiu-jitsu
Female Brazilian jiu-jitsu practitioners
American Muay Thai practitioners
Female Muay Thai practitioners
21st-century American women